Ponhofi Senior Secondary School is a government school in the Ohangwena region, Namibia. It is one of the schools that between 1987 and 1988 students were killed or severely wounded after soldiers opened fire at their rooms/hostels in retaliation for attacks by the People's Liberation Army of Namibia (PLAN) combatants.  Ponhofi is one of the top academic schools in the Ohangwena region, with a strong focus on academics, leadership, sports, and culture.

History 
The Ponhofi School in the north became the key rallying point as students demanded the demilitarisation of education and the removal of military bases from schools and the implementation of the UN Resolution 435.

Ponhofi lost its students when PLAN fighters attacked the South West Africa Territorial Force (SWATF) military base between 1987 and 1988, two students were murdered and seven others were injured by the military. ponhofi hosted the 19th edition of the Kapuka Annual tournament in the year 2015.

Challenges that halted the school operations 
National student boycotts  that happened during the colonial era 1988 in Ponhofi Secondary School in today's Ohangwena region halted the school operations and many learners were affected. In the same vein, in 2020 Ponhofi Secondary School temporarily suspended classes for its grade 11 and 12 learners after a staff member tested positive for COVID-19.

Education 
Ponhofi Secondary School has been serving quality education to Namibian students from grade Grade 8 to grade Grade 12 for years. Almost 900-1500 students are getting an education from Ponhofi Secondary School right now. The school is also a registered NAMCOL center for those that are improving their grades.

References 

Schools in Ohangwena Region
High schools and secondary schools in Namibia